The 12377 / 12378 Padatik Superfast Express is a daily Superfast train which runs between Sealdah in West Bengal and  in West Bengal via New Jalpaiguri Junction (Siliguri) in West Bengal.

The train belongs to Eastern Railways and travel time over the whole route is just over 12 hours. This train is named after renowned Bengali poet Subhash Mukhopadhyay's book Padatik.

The train is numbered as 12377 / 12378 and offers all the available classes of travel on Indian Railways-AC First Class (H1), AC First-cum-Second Class (HA1), AC 2-tier (A1-A2), AC 3-tier (B1–B6), Sleeper Class (S1–S6) and Second Sitting (D1-D3). The train is composed of 23 coaches.

Route & halts 

The important halts of the train are:

  (Starts)
  
  
  
 
 
  
 New Jalpaiguri Junction (Siliguri) 
 
 Mathabhanga 
 
  (Ends)

Coach composition 

Sealdah to New Alipurduar

 to

Traction
From  to  it is hauled by a Diesel Loco Shed, Siliguri-based WDP-4D/WDP-4D/WDP-4B locomotive and vice versa.

Gallery

Other trains on the Kolkata–New Jalpaiguri sector
 22301/02 Howrah–New Jalpaiguri Vande Bharat Express
 12041/42 New Jalpaiguri–Howrah Shatabdi Express
 22309/40 Howrah–New Jalpaiguri AC Express
 12343/44 Darjeeling Mail
 13149/50 Kanchan Kanya Express
 15959/60 Kamrup Express
 13175/76 Kanchenjunga Express
 12345/46 Saraighat Express
 15722/23 New Jalpaiguri-Digha Express
 12518/19 Kolkata Garib Rath Express
 12526/27 Dibrugarh–Kolkata Superfast Express
 13141/42 Teesta Torsha Express
 13147/58 Uttar Banga Express
 12503/04 Bangalore Humsafar Express
 13181/82 Kolkata–Silghat Town Kaziranga Express
 22511/12 Lokmanya Tilak Terminus–Kamakhya Karmabhoomi Express
 12526/27 Dibrugarh–Kolkata Superfast Express
 15644/45 Puri–Kamakhya Weekly Express (via Howrah)
 12364/65 Kolkata–Haldibari Intercity Express
 12509/10 Guwahati–Bengaluru Cantt. Superfast Express
 12507/08 Thiruvananthapuram–Silchar Superfast Express
 12514/15 Guwahati–Secunderabad Express

See also 
 Howrah–New Jalpaiguri line
 Darjeeling Mail
 New Jalpaiguri–Howrah Shatabdi Express

Notes

References

Transport in Kolkata
Express trains in India
Rail transport in West Bengal
Railway services introduced in 2009
Named passenger trains of India
Transport in Siliguri